Alt Tellin is a municipality in the Vorpommern-Greifswald district, in Mecklenburg-Vorpommern, Germany.

Originally named Siedenbüssow, the region has long been associated with the porcine trade. The region is primarily characterized by farms. Its name was changed to Alt Tellin on January 1, 1951. The word "Bussow" derives from Burgh, meaning "hill." 

On March 31, 2021, a major fire destroyed the piglet production plant of LFD Holding in Alt Tellin consisting of 18 stables. Only 1300 of the 51.000 penned sows and piglets survived, the damage was estimated at around €40 million.

References 

Vorpommern-Greifswald